Çeltikçi is a small town in Kızılcahamam district of Ankara Province,  Turkey. The population of Çeltikçi was 499   as of 2011. The earliest references to Çeltikçi are of 1691 when the Ottoman government forced a small Turkmen tribe to settle. But later other people like Circassians from the Caucasus, Turks from Veliko Tarnovo (modern Bulgaria), Circassians and Tatars from Dobruja (modern Romania) were also settled in Çeltikçi.

References

Populated places in Ankara Province
Towns in Turkey
Kızılcahamam